PS Projotamansari Bantul or PS Protaba is an Indonesian football club based in Bantul Regency, Yogyakarta. Club played in Liga 3. They play their home games at either Sultan Agung Stadium or Dwi Windu Stadium.

References

Bantul Regency
Football clubs in the Special Region of Yogyakarta
Football clubs in Indonesia
Association football clubs established in 2007
2007 establishments in Indonesia